Horseheads Central School District is a school district in Horseheads, New York. It is one of three districts in Chemung County, located in Upstate New York's Southern Tier Region. The district has an estimated population of 25,000, spanning some 143 square miles. The district serves the towns of Big Flats, Catlin, Cayuta, Erin, Horseheads, and Veteran; the villages of Horseheads and Millport; and the hamlets of Breesport and Pine Valley, all in Chemung County. Thomas Douglas is Superintendent of Schools.

It has been named one of the best 100 school districts in the United States for Music Education in the United States. This program has worked with guest conductors and composers such as Douglas Akey, Frank Ticheli, Andrew Boysen, David Holsinger, Chris Tucker, and Timothy Mahr.

Board of education
The board is made up of ten members. Current board members are:
Pam Strollo, President
Brian Lynch, Vice President
Karen Boulas
Lisa Christiansen
Daniel Christmas
Warren Conklin
Kristine Dale
Doug Johnson
David Sadler
Matthew Minor, Student Representative

Schools
It operates four elementary schools, one intermediate school, one middle school, and one high school. 
Big Flats Elementary School, Principal - Elizabeth Scaptura
Center Street Elementary School, Principal - Patricia Sotero
Gardner Road Elementary School, Principal - Patrick Patterson
Ridge Road Elementary School, Principal - Anne-Marie Manikowski-Bailey
Horseheads Intermediate School (Grades 5–6), Principal - Michael Bostwick
Horseheads Middle School (Grades 7–8), Principal - Ron Holloway
Horseheads High School (Grades 9–12), Principal - Karen Donahue

Athletics 
Horseheads Schools participate in the NYSPHAA Southern Tier Athletic Conference. The school district has 26 athletic teams, spread out over three seasons.

Fall Sports:
 Boys Football
 Mixed Cheerleading
 Boys Cross Country
 Girls Cross Country
 Boys Soccer
 Girls Soccer
 Boys Golf
 Girls Swimming
 Girls Tennis
 Boys Volleyball 
 Girls Volleyball
Winter Sports:
 Boys Basketball
 Girls Basketball
 Boys Wrestling
 Girls Bowling
 Boys Bowling
 Boys Swimming
 Mixed Indoor Track
 Mixed Cheerleading
Spring Sports:
 Boys Baseball
 Girls Softball
 Boys Lacrosse
 Girls Lacrosse
 Boys Tennis
 Girls Golf
 Boys Track and Field
 Girls Track and Field

See also
List of school districts in New York

References

Education in Chemung County, New York
School districts in New York (state)
Horseheads, New York
School districts established in 1950